The 2007 McNeese State Cowboys football team was an American football team that represented McNeese State University as a member of the Southland Conference (Southland) during the 2007 NCAA Division I FCS football season. In their second year under head coach Matt Viator, the team compiled an overall record of 11–1, with a mark of 7–0 in conference play, and finished as Southland champion.

Schedule

References

McNeese State
McNeese Cowboys football seasons
Southland Conference football champion seasons
McNeese State Cowyboys football